The Yakima practical alphabet is an orthography used to write Sahaptin languages of the Pacific Northwest of North America.

History 
The Yakima practical alphabet is based on the Americanist phonetic notation as well as the International Phonetic Alphabet (IPA).

Uses 

The Yakima practical alphabet is currently used in research, language teaching, and language revitalization efforts. According to Jansen (2010), Sahaptian languages

Comparison with other orthographies

References

Sahaptian languages
Native American language revitalization
Orthography
Alphabets